The 38th Karlovy Vary International Film Festival took place from 4 to 12 July 2003. The Crystal Globe was won by Facing Windows, an Italian drama film directed by Ferzan Özpetek. The second prize, the Special Jury Prize was won by Babusya, a Croatian drama film directed by Lidiya Bobrova.

Juries
The following people formed the juries of the festival: 
Main competition
 Rock Demers, Jury President (Canada)
 Buddhadeb Dasgupta (India)
 Aňa Geislerová (Czech Republic)
 Baltasar Kormákur (Poland)
 Felice Laudadio (Italy)
 Sunmin Park (USA)
 Branko Šömen (Slovenia)
Documentaries
 Gunnar Bergdahl, president (Sweden)
 Ivan Vojnár (Czech Republic)
 Ludmila Cviková (Netherlands)
 Jelena Stišová (Russia)
 Atahualpa Lichy (Venezuela)

Official selection awards

The following feature films and people received the official selection awards:
 Crystal Globe (Grand Prix) - Facing Windows (La Finestra di fronte) by Ferzan Özpetek (Italy, UK, Turkey, Portugal)
 Special Jury Prize - Babusya (Babusja) by Lidiya Bobrova (Russia, France)
 Best Director Award - Ferzan Özpetek for Facing Windows (La Finestra di fronte) (Italy, UK, Turkey, Portugal)
 Best Actress Award (ex aequo) - Sylvie Testud for her role in Fear and Trembling (Stupeur et Tremblements) (France, Japan) & Giovanna Mezzogiorno for her role in Facing Windows (La Finestra di fronte) (Italy, UK, Turkey, Portugal)
 Best Actor Award - Björn Kjellman for his role in Old, New, Borrowed and Blue (Se til venstre, der er en svensker) (Denmark)
 Special Jury Mention - Fear and Trembling (Stupeur et Tremblements) by Alain Corneau (France, Japan) & A Rózsa énekei by Andor Szilágyi (Hungary)

Other statutory awards
Other statutory awards that were conferred at the festival:
 Best documentary film (over 30 min.) - Jesus, You Know (Jesus, Du weisst) by Ulrich Seidl (Austria)
 Special Jury Mention - Documentarist (Vaveragrogh) by Harutyun Khachatryan (Armenia)
 Best documentary film (under 30 min.) - The Zone (Zonen) by Esaisas Baitel (Sweden)
 Special Jury Mention - My Body (Kroppen min) by Margreth Olin (Norway) & Portrait (Portret) by Sergei Loznitsa (Russia)
 Crystal Globe for Outstanding Artistic Contribution to World Cinema - Stephen Frears (UK), Jiří Menzel (Czech Republic), Morgan Freeman (USA)
 Award of the Town of Karlovy Vary - The Coast Guard (Haeanseon) Kim Ki-duk (South Korea)
 Audience Award - Buddy by Lars Gudmestad (Norway)

Non-statutory awards
The following non-statutory awards were conferred at the festival:
 FIPRESCI International Critics Award: The Coast Guard (Haeanseon) Kim Ki-duk (South Korea)
 FICC - The Don Quixote Prize: Babusya (Babusja) by Lidiya Bobrova (Russia, France)
 Ecumenical Jury Award: Babusya (Babusja) by Lidiya Bobrova (Russia, France)
 Philip Morris Film Award: Roads to Koktebel (Koktebel) by Boris Khlebnikov & Aleksey Popogrebskiy (Russia) & Edi by Piotr Trzaskalski (Poland)
 NETPAC Award: The Coast Guard (Haeanseon) Kim Ki-duk (South Korea)

References

2003 film awards
Karlovy Vary International Film Festival